Gay USA is a weekly one-hour news program "...devoted to in-depth coverage of gay, lesbian, bisexual, and transgender issues" on a local, state, national, and international level. It is taped in the studios of, and aired by, Manhattan Neighborhood Network in Manhattan, New York. It airs on Manhattan Public-access television cable TV and Free Speech TV, and is available worldwide as a podcast at the show's website or to subscribe via iTunes.

Current format 
Typically, Gay USA begins with a quick introduction by hosts Andy Humm and Ann Northrop then moves into news segments as viewed from the gay perspective. Regular segments include gay news, AIDS news, and entertainment news. The anchors refer to notes kept in front of them on the table during this portion of the show. Hosts Humm and Northrop often interject their news delivery with accounts of personal experiences and "...light, snappy repartee and good-natured verbal sparring and banter." Following the news topics of the week, guests are interviewed and/or videos clips are presented for the second half of the show. Bill Bahlman, Associate Producer of Gay USA posts a weekly Podcast edition of the show which is available on iTunes and from the show's official website GayUSATV.org

History 
Gay USA was preceded by Pride and Progress which first aired in 1985 on the Gay Cable Network (GCN). Independently produced and supported by GCN owner Lou Maletta, Pride and Progress was hosted by journalist/activist Andy Humm. The program covered LGBT topics, including the Democratic and Republican National Conventions from a gay perspective.

In 1996, journalist/activist Ann Northrop began co-hosting Gay USA with Humm.

Bill Bahlman, Associate Producer of Gay USA has a long history as an LGBT Activist. Organizations he served with or helped found include the Gay Activists Alliance, GLAAD, CLGR, The Lavender Hill Mob, and ACTUP New York.

Since September 2001, the show has aired on Manhattan Neighborhood Network. In 2003, Gay USA became nationally available through Free Speech TV. Podcasts of the show became available in 2006.

On 21 February 2012 episode, show guest Daniel O'Donnell surprised hosts Andy Humm and Ann Northrop in presenting to each Pen Certificates signed by Governor Andrew Cuomo from the 2011 New York Marriage Equality Act, stating "I know of no one in the entire country who has done more for our community than the two of you". O'Donnell, a recurring guest, had introduced the same-sex marriage bill.

Interviews and guests 
Gay USA includes interviews of individuals regarding relevant projects, organizations or entertainment. Guests have ranged from an out-gay, and thus unemployed, priest to a gay male couple with adopted children to political figures and entertainers. Some of the program's notable guests have included:
 Edward Albee, three-time Pulitzer Prize–winning playwright
 Alison Bechdel, comic strip and graphic author, notably of Fun Home
 Wayne Besen, gay rights advocate
 Matthew Bourne, British choreographer
 Rev.Pat Bumgardner, Pastor of the Metropolitan Community Church
 Justice Edwin Cameron, senior South African official
 Thomas Duane, New York State Senator
 Martin Duberman, historian
 Marga Gomez, award-winning comedian
 Lesley Gore, singer and songwriter
 Alan Hollinghurst, author of award-winning The Line of Beauty
 Rabbi Sharon Kleinbaum, LGBT Synagogue
 Scott Long, Executive Director of LGBT Rights Project, Human Rights Watch
 Joseph Lovett, film maker, notably of Gay Sex in the 70s
 Michael Musto, columnist
 Christine Quinn, Speaker of the New York City Council
 Tully Satre, youth activist
 Sir Antony Sher, actor, novelist and artist
 Lily Tomlin, comedian who publicly came out on the show in 2000
 Tree, Stonewall Inn bartender
 Paula Vogel, Pulitzer Prize–winning playwright
 Kenji Yoshino, author as well as professor of intellectual life at Yale Law School
Organizations involved in LGBT rights and information dissemination have also been represented on the show by various guests. These include:
 ACLU Lesbian & Gay Rights Project: Litigation Director James Esseks; Matt Coles
 Equality Ride: Activists Haven Herrin & Jake Reitan
 Gay, Lesbian and Straight Education Network: Kevin Jennings
 Lambda Legal Defense and Education Fund: Attorney Alphonso David
 National Gay and Lesbian Task Force: Executive Director Matt Forman
 Sexuality Information and Education Council of the United States: Monica Rodriguez

Gay USA Team 
Frequently, the folks who work on and/or for Gay USA refer to themselves as the "Gay USA Team." In alphabetical order, the team currently consists of:
 Bill Bahlman - Associate Producer, photographer, archivist and activist
 Andy Humm - Host, journalist/activist
 Ann Northrop - Host, journalist/activist
 Rich Speziale - Studio Director (employed by MNN)

Guest co-hosts
Guest co-hosts who have filled in for either Humm or Northrop include:
 Corey Johnson (politician)
 Chris Cooper

See also 

 Media of New York City
 Culture of New York City
 Sexuality and gender identity-based cultures
 The Soup

References

External links 
 
 
 Gay USA on Free Speech TV - select videos available.
 Gay USA's MNN listing
 Watch Gay USA online as part of Free Speech TV's video content on blip.tv.

1985 American television series debuts
1980s American television news shows
1990s American television news shows
2000s American television news shows
2010s American television news shows
1980s American LGBT-related television series
American public access television shows
1990s American LGBT-related television series
2000s American LGBT-related television series
2010s American LGBT-related television series